The A 13-1 is a motorway that connects the A 1 and the A 13 for a total of . It has a west–east orientation and also serves as a link from IC 2 to A 1.

This has been open to traffic since December 2012. It belongs to the Pinhal Interior Subconcession owned by Ascendi, being carried by means of electronic toll. Unlike the A 13, which is also part of the Pinhal Interior Subconcession, there is no exemption for local traffic on this motorway.

The road carries very little traffic.

References 

Motorways in Portugal